Shawnigan Lake School is a co-educational independent boarding school located on Vancouver Island in Shawnigan Lake, British Columbia, Canada. It was founded by Englishman Christopher Windley "C. W." Lonsdale in 1916 and was partly modelled after the Westminster School in England.

Located on 270 acres of lakefront property, the campus has 35 buildings including 11 boarding houses, an observatory, an ice arena, a crew house, grass rugby pitches, water-based field hockey turf, a Growing Dome, and a fish hatchery.

The school's Latin motto, means "Let whosoever deserves the palm bear it."

Location

Shawnigan Lake School is built on the shores of Shawnigan Lake and occupies a wooded  property. It is located just a few minutes away from the village of Shawnigan Lake, or a 45-minute drive from Victoria, British Columbia on Vancouver Island.

Students 
As of September 2021, the student body at Shawnigan Lakes School consists of 520 students representing 27 countries with 430 students residing on campus in the boarding houses, making it a boarding school with the largest number of full-time boarders in Canada. Day students constitute 10 percent of the student body. Students come from all over the world, with 20% from International locations, 15% from the United States, 15% from other Canadian Provinces and 50% of students being from British Columbia.

Current campus
Currently, Shawnigan has approximately 35 buildings on its campus, ranging from classrooms, dormitories and staff housing, to a theatre, ice hockey arena, and extensive sports fields.

Boarding Houses 
The school is primarily a boarding school with 90% of its students attending the school as boarders. The school currently has 6 residences for boys and 5 residences for girls. Each boarding house has a house director (formerly called the housemaster) and an assistant house director, who is assisted by student house prefects in the management of house duties and issues.

Copeman's House: Founded in September 1929 and named for John Y. Copeman, a Victoria lawyer who was chairman of the Board of Governors for many years. The original building, which housed 90 boys and had its own kitchen and dining room, mysteriously burned to the ground one night in the autumn of 1968. The current dorm was built in 2005.

Duxbury House: Founded in September 1999 and named after Frank Duxbury, a teacher who was Senior Master at the school during the 1950s and early ’60s.

Groves' House: Founded in September 1927, “Groves’” was named after Jocelyn James Douglas Groves, its first head of the house, who rose to the rank of lieutenant colonel in the British Army. Groves’ was converted to a girls' residence in 1992. Groves’ House was rebuilt in 2004.

Kaye's House: Founded in September 1989 as the second girls’ house, it was named to honour G. Peter Kaye, the school's second headmaster, whose sons and grandsons also attended the school.

Lake's House: One of the two original houses, “Lake’s” was founded on May 12, 1927. “Lake’s” was named after Harry John Lake, its first head of the house, who later became a colonel in the Canadian Army. Col. Lake's uncle, Sir Percy Lake, was the first Chief of the Canadian General Staff and served as chairman of the Board of Governors, while the Colonel's father was Sir Richard Lake, sometime Lieutenant-Governor of Saskatchewan.

Lonsdale's House: Founded in September 1968 and named for Christopher Windley Lonsdale, Shawnigan's first and founding headmaster. “Lonsdale’s” moved into a new building in March 2007.

Renfrew House: Established in September 1996 in order to expand the space for girls wishing to enroll at the school.

Ripley's House: One of the two original houses, “Ripley’s” was founded on May 12, 1927, and was named after its first Head of House, Alexander 'Alec' B. Ripley.

Strathcona House: Founded in 2007 and named to mark Shawnigan's long association with Strathcona Lodge School, a defunct girls’ school in Shawnigan Lake which closed its doors in 1977. Shawnigan has since adopted the former 'Old Girls' of 'Strath' as honorary Shawnigan alumnae to incorporate earlier generations of women from Strathcona Lodge School alumnae within the ranks of Shawnigan's current alumni.

Stanton House: Founded in September 2019 to house the Grade 8 girls. Stanton is named after the first school nurse at Shawnigan, Eleanor Stanton who worked there from 1918 to 1962.

Levien House: Founded in September 2020 to house the Grade 8 boys after the success of Stanton House. Named after a dedicated and dynamic member of staff from the 1920-1930s, Captain 'Tiny' Levien was a colleague of Stanton. He introduced Rugby to Shawnigan and taught the younger boys.

Former
School House: Founded in September 1988 as the inaugural girls’ residence in the School, named after its unique position in a refurbished wing of the School's main building, School House was replaced in 2007 by Strathcona Lodge School House.

Academics
Shawnigan's academic program is university preparatory. Shawnigan was ranked by the Fraser Institute in 2017 as 11th out of 253 British Columbian Secondary Schools based on a score of 9.3/10 for academic achievements.

English
 Basic English
 English Literature
 Creative Writing
Social Studies
 Basic Social Studies
 Earth Science
 History
 Geography
 Comparative Civilizations
 Advanced Placement Art History
Mathematics
 Basic Mathematics
 Foundations and Pre-Calculus
 Pre-Calculus
 Calculus
Science
 Basic Science
 Biology
 Environmental Science
 Chemistry
 Physics
Modern Languages
 French
 Spanish
 Mandarin
 German
Curricular Fine Arts
 Basic Art
 Concert Band
 Stage Jazz Band
 Choir
 Wood Work
Information Technology
 Computer-Assisted Draughting
 Graphic Design
 Information Technology
Business
 Commerce
 Economics
 Entrepreneurship

Fine arts
Students are encouraged to try a variety of Fine Arts, selecting from a list of twenty options.

Performing Arts
 Choir
 Dance
 Debate
 Drama
 Musical Theatre
 Orchestra
Visual Arts
 Photography
 Pottery
 Sculpture
 Studio Art
 Textile Arts
 Woodwork
 Yearbook
 View Team
 Fashion Design
 Film
 Illustration
 Fly Tying
Community Service
 Environment Club
 Outreach
 Civic Leadership

Athletics
The athletics program at Shawnigan Lake School is an extension of the School's mission statement: "Through athletics, we lead young people in the pursuit of personal excellence.”

Shawnigan has partnerships with Rugby Canada and Rowing Canada which bring national teams to train at the school.

In 2014, Shawnigan joined the Canadian Sport School Hockey League.

Boys Sports Program
 Badminton
 Basketball
 Rowing
 Cross Country Running
 Fitness
 Golf
 Ice Hockey
 Outdoors
Boys Sports Con't
 Rugby Football
 Soccer Football
 Search & Rescue
 Squash
 Swimming
 Tennis
Girls Sports Program
 Badminton
 Basketball
 Rowing
 Cross Country Running
 Fitness
 Golf
 Ice Hockey
 Outdoors
Girls Sports Con't
 Rugby Football
 Soccer Football
 Search & Rescue
 Squash
 Swimming
 Lawn Tennis
 Volleyball
 Field Hockey

Headmasters

School athletic championships

(Note: championships exist pre-2001 to the founding.)

Rugby union
BC AAAA Boys Rugby Champions - 2019
BC AAAA Boys Rugby Champions - 2017 
BC AAA Junior Boys Rugby Champions - 2017 
Junior Boys Rugby 7s Champions – 2016
BC AAA Junior Boys Rugby Champions – 2016
Girls CAIS Rugby Champions – 2016
BC Girls AA Rugby Champions – 2016
Senior Boys CAIS Rugby Champions – 2016
BC Boys AAAA Rugby Champions – 2016
BC Boys AAA Rugby Champions – 2015
BC Boys AAA Rugby Champions – 2013
BC Boys AAA Rugby Champions – 2012
BC Boys AAA Rugby Champions – 2011
BC Boys AAA Rugby Champions – 2010
BC Boys AAA Rugby Champions – 2009
Boys CAIS National Rugby Champions – 2008
BC Boys AAA Rugby Champions – 1998
BC Girls AA Rugby Champions – 1997
BC Girls AA Rugby Champions – 1996

Field hockey
BC Girls AAA Sr. Field Hockey Champions – 2014
BC Girls AA Field Hockey Champions – 2011

Ice hockey
CSSHL Midget Varsity Champions – Boy's Midget Varsity – 2016
CSSHL Midget Varsity Champions – Boy's Midget Varsity – 2015

(Note: championships exist pre-1996 to the founding.)

Notable people

Notable alumni

Artists

Robert Stewart Hyndman – Artist
Peter Saul – Artist

Athletes

George Hungerford – Gold Medal Olympian – Rowing
John Lecky – Silver Medal Olympian – Rowing
Kristopher McDaniel – Team Canada Rower
Josh Jackson – Rugby Canada Player
Hannah Darling – Rio 2016 Olympic Bronze Medal, 2015 Pan American Games Gold Medal, Women's Rugby 7's Team Canada
Eloise Blackwel - New Zealand Black Ferns
Brett Beukeboom - Rugby Canada and Cornish Pirates
John Lander (rower) - 1928 Olympic Gold Medalist, coxless four
Eddie Evans (rugby player) Prop for Canada national team. Played 3 World Cups in 1987, 1991 and 1995.

Broadcasting

Bob Kerr (d. 2003) – CBC radio Classical music programme presenter of Off the Record for 36 years (retired 1996)

Business

Jim Shaw – CEO Shaw Communications

Entertainment

Jon Kimura Parker – Order of Canada, Concert Pianist
Tara Spencer-Nairn – Actress, Corner Gas

Politics

The Hon. Henry Pybus Bell-Irving – Lt. Governor of British Columbia
Peter Ladner – Vancouver City Councillor
Stephen D. Owen – Former Member of Parliament
Anthony Vincent - Canadian ambassador to Peru and later, to Spain

Scholars and scientists

Graham Anderson – Scholar
Dr. Barry F. Cooper – Canadian Political Scientist
Dr. Steve Deering – Computer Scientist
Dr. Roger Stanier – Microbiologist

Notable staff
For a full list see List of Shawnigan Lake School people

Tom Brierley – Cricketer
Robert Ivan Knight – Founder/First Headmaster of Qualicum College
Mark A. Hobson – Wildlife Artist
Count Leonid Pavlovich Ignatiev (d. 1988) – University of Toronto Slavics professor, grandson of Count Nikolai Pavlovich Ignatiev, son of Count Pavel Nikolayevich Ignatiev, brother of George Pavlovich Ignatiev, CC, and uncle of the formers' son, Michael Ignatieff, MP, former leader of the Liberal Party of Canada
James Robertson Justice – Actor

Affiliations
The Anglican Church of Canada, diocese of British Columbia
CAIS – Canadian Accredited Independent Schools
NAIS – National Association of Independent Schools
TABS – The Association of Boarding Schools
FISA BC - Federation of Independent School Associations in British Columbia
ISABC - Independent Schools Association of BC

References

Bibliography
Rough Diamond: An Oral History of Shawnigan Lake School by Jay Connolly.
The Handbook of Canadian Boarding Schools, by Lafortune, Sylvie, Thomson, Ashley, p. 115

External links

The Association of Boarding Schools
Shawnigan Lake School Profile By TopPrivateSchools.ca

Schools
Anglican schools in Canada
Boarding schools in British Columbia
Private schools in British Columbia
High schools in British Columbia
Preparatory schools in British Columbia
Member schools of the Headmasters' and Headmistresses' Conference
Educational institutions established in 1916
School buildings completed in 2002
1916 establishments in British Columbia